The Dutch municipality Brielle is divided into districts and neighbourhoods for statistical purposes. The municipality is divided into the following statistical districts:

 District 00 Brielle (CBS-neighbourhood code:050100)
 District 01 Vierpolders (CBS-neighbourhood code:050101)
 District 02 Zwartewaal (CBS-neighbourhood code:050102)
 District 03 Recreatiestrook Brielse Maas (CBS-neighbourhood code:050103)

A statistical district may consist of several neighbourhoods. The table below shows the neighbourhood division with characteristic values according to the Statistics Netherlands (CBS, 2008):

|}

References

Voorne aan Zee
Lists of neighborhoods in Dutch municipalities